Şaban Dişli (born 22 February 1958 Geyve, Sakarya), is a Turkish politician.

He was a founding member of the Justice and Development Party (Turkey). He was the  vice president. He currently holds the Chairman position as advisor. He is married and has three children. In September 2018, he was appointed as Turkish ambassador to the Kingdom of the Netherlands and Permanent Representative to the Organisation for the Prohibition of Chemical Weapons.
Şaban Dişli is the brother of Mehmet Dişli, who claims to be a member of the Peace at Home Council and the Gülen movement.

References

Living people
1958 births
Justice and Development Party (Turkey) politicians
21st-century Turkish politicians
Ambassadors of Turkey to the Netherlands
Permanent Representatives of Turkey to the Organisation for the Prohibition of Chemical Weapons
Sakarya 
Members of the 22nd Parliament of Turkey
Members of the 23rd Parliament of Turkey
Members of the 24th Parliament of Turkey 
Members of the 26th Parliament of Turkey